Ian Brodie (born 1967) is a Canadian political scientist.

Ian Brodie is also the name of:

 Ian Brodie (journalist) (1936–2008), British journalist and foreign correspondent

See also
 Ian Broudie (born 1958), English musician and producer, best known for his 1990s band the Lightning Seeds